Pacto de Sangre (Eng.: Pact of Blood) is the title of a studio album released by Regional Mexican band Los Tigres del Norte. This album became their fifth number-one set on the Billboard Top Latin Albums. Pacto de Sangre was nominated for a Lo Nuestro Award for Regional Mexican Album of the Year.

Track listing
The information from Billboard and Allmusic.

CD track listing

DVD track listing

Chart performance

Sales and certifications

References

Los Tigres del Norte albums
Latin Grammy Award for Best Norteño Album
2004 albums
Fonovisa Records albums